Victor Ruberry (born 23 August 1959) is a Bermudian swimmer. He competed at the 1984 Summer Olympics and the 1988 Summer Olympics.

References

External links
 

1959 births
Living people
Bermudian male swimmers
Commonwealth Games competitors for Bermuda
Swimmers at the 1982 Commonwealth Games
Swimmers at the 1986 Commonwealth Games
Pan American Games competitors for Bermuda
Swimmers at the 1979 Pan American Games
Olympic swimmers of Bermuda
Swimmers at the 1984 Summer Olympics
Swimmers at the 1988 Summer Olympics
Place of birth missing (living people)